The Andaman and Nicobar Islands is a union territory of India consisting of 572 islands, of which 37 are inhabited, at the junction of the Bay of Bengal and the Andaman Sea. It comprises two island groups, the Andaman Islands (partly) and the Nicobar Islands, separated by the 150 km (100 mile) wide Ten Degree Channel (on the 10°N parallel), with the Andaman islands to the north of this latitude, and the Nicobar islands to the south (or by 179 km; 111 miles). The Andaman Sea lies to the east and the Bay of Bengal to the west. The island chains are thought to be a submerged extension of the Arakan Mountains.

The territory's capital is the city of Port Blair. The territory is divided into three districts: the Nicobar District with Car Nicobar as its capital, the South Andaman district with Port Blair as its capital, and the North and Middle Andaman district with Mayabunder as its capital.

The islands host the Andaman and Nicobar Command, the only tri-service geographical command of the Indian Armed Forces.

The Andaman Islands are also home to the Sentinelese people, an uncontacted tribe. The Sentinelese are considered to be the only people currently known to not have reached further than a Paleolithic level of technology; however, this is disputed, as evidence of metalwork was found on their island.

History

First inhabitants
The earliest archaeological evidence documents some 2,200 years. However, genetic and cultural studies suggest that the indigenous Andamanese people may have been isolated from other populations during the Middle Paleolithic, which ended 30,000 years ago. Since that time, the Andamanese have diversified into linguistically and culturally distinct territorial groups.

The Nicobar Islands appear to have been populated by people of various backgrounds. By the time of European contact, the indigenous inhabitants had coalesced into the Nicobarese people, speaking an Austroasiatic language, and the Shompen, whose language is of uncertain affiliation. Neither language is related to Andamanese.

Chola Period

Rajendra Chola II (1051–1063 CE), used the Andaman and Nicobar Islands as a strategic naval base to launch an expedition against the Srivijaya Empire (Indonesia). The Cholas called the island Ma-Nakkavaram ("great open/naked land"), found in the Thanjavur inscription of 1050 CE. European traveller Marco Polo (12th–13th century) also referred to this island as 'Necuverann' and a corrupted form of the Tamil name Nakkavaram would have led to the modern name Nicobar during the British colonial period.

Maratha imperial period
The islands became a temporary shipping port of the Maratha Empire and its navy in the 17th century. The Maratha admiral Kanhoji Angre established a basic naval dominance in the islands and played a role in the annexation of the islands to India.

Danish colonial period and British rule

The history of organised European colonisation on the islands began when settlers from the Danish East India Company arrived in the Nicobar Islands on 12 December 1755. On 1 January 1756, the Nicobar Islands were made a Danish colony, first named New Denmark, and later (December 1756) Frederick's Islands (Frederiksøerne). During 1754–1756 they were administrated from Tranquebar (in continental Danish India). The islands were repeatedly abandoned due to outbreaks of malaria between 14 April 1759 and 19 August 1768, from 1787 to 1807/05, 1814 to 1831, 1830 to 1834 and gradually from 1848 for good.

From 1 June 1778 to 1784, Austria mistakenly assumed that Denmark had abandoned its claims to the Nicobar Islands and attempted to establish a colony on them, renaming them Theresa Islands.

In 1789, the British set up a naval base and penal colony on Chatham Island next to Great Andaman, where now lies the town of Port Blair. Two years later the colony was moved to Port Cornwallis on Great Andaman, but it was abandoned in 1796 due to disease.

In 1858, the British again established a colony at Port Blair, which proved to be more permanent. The primary purpose was to set up a penal colony for criminal convicts from the Indian subcontinent. The Cellular Jail, which was used to house political prisoners, was constructed on the islands.

Italy made an attempt at buying the Nicobar Islands from Denmark between 1864 and 1865. The Italian Minister of Agriculture and Commerce Luigi Torelli started a negotiation that looked promising, but failed due to the unexpected end of his office and the second La Marmora Cabinet. The negotiations were interrupted and never brought up again.

Denmark's presence in the territory ended formally on 16 October 1868 when it sold the rights to the Nicobar Islands to Britain, which made them part of British India in 1869.

In 1872, the Andaman and Nicobar islands were united under a single chief commissioner at Port Blair.

World War II

During World War II, the islands were practically under Japanese control, only nominally under the authority of the Arzi Hukumate Azad Hind of Subhash Chandra Bose. Bose visited the islands during the war and renamed them as "Shaheed-Dweep" (Martyr Island) and "Swaraj-dweep" (Self-rule Island).

General Loganathan, of the Indian National Army, was made the Governor of the Andaman and Nicobar Islands. On 22 February 1944 he along with four INA officers—Major Mansoor Ali Alvi, Sub. Lt. Md. Iqbal, Lt. Suba Singh, and stenographer Srinivasan—arrived at Lambaline Airport in Port Blair. On 21 March 1944, the Headquarters of the Civil Administration was established near the gurdwara at Aberdeen Bazaar. On 2 October 1944, Col. Loganathan handed over the charge to Maj. Alvi and left Port Blair, never to return.

Japanese Vice Admiral Hara Teizo and Major-General Tamenori Sato surrendered the islands to Brigadier J A Salomons, commander of 116th Indian Infantry Brigade, and Chief Administrator Noel K Patterson, Indian Civil Service, on 7 October 1945, in a ceremony performed on the Gymkhana Ground, Port Blair.

After independence
During the independence of both India (1947) and Burma (1948), the departing British announced their intention to retain possession of the island chain, and use them to resettle Anglo-Indians and Anglo-Burmese on these islands, to form their own nation, although this never materialised. The islands, as a possession of the British Indian Empire, claimed as an asset to allocated, by both the Congress Party and Muslim League, during partition negotiations. The Islands were later used to resettle peoples displaced by the partitions of the British Indian Empire, with a substantial number of displaced East Bengali families offered land on the islands, in exchange for clearing forests and establishing agricultural colonies. Responsibility for the administration of the islands was transferred from Viceroy Mountbatten, to President Rajendra Prasad, in 1950, and was declared as a union territory of the India, in 1956.

India has been developing defence facilities on the islands since the 1980s. The islands now have a key position in India's strategic role in the Bay of Bengal and the Malacca Strait.

2004 tsunami

More than 2,000 people died, 4,000 children were orphaned or suffered the loss of one parent, and at least 40,000 people were rendered homeless. More than 46,000 people were injured. The worst affected Nicobar islands were Katchal and Indira Point; the latter subsided  and was partially submerged in the ocean. The lighthouse at Indira Point was damaged but has been repaired since. A significant portion of the union territory was submerged and subsequently lost to sea.

While the locals and tourists on the islands suffered the greatest casualties from the tsunami, most of the aboriginal people survived on account of oral traditions passed down over generations that warned them to evacuate from the large waves that follow earthquakes.

Geography

Of these 38 are permanently inhabited. The islands extend from 6° to 14° North latitudes and from 92° to 94° East longitudes. The highest point is located in North Andaman Island (Saddle Peak at ).

They are grouped with South India. Indira Point at 6°45’10″N and 93°49’36″E at the southern tip of the southernmost island, Great Nicobar, is the southernmost point of India and lies only  from Sumatra island in Indonesia.

The only volcano in India, Barren Island, is located in Andaman and Nicobar. It is an active volcano and had last erupted in 2017. It also has a mud volcano situated in Baratang Island. These mud volcanoes have erupted sporadically, with recent eruptions in 2005 believed to have been associated with the 2004 Indian Ocean earthquake. The previous major eruption recorded was on 18 February 2003. The locals call this mud volcano Jalki. There are other volcanoes in the area. This island's beaches, mangrove creeks, limestone caves, and mud volcanoes are some of the physical features.

In December 2018, Prime Minister Narendra Modi, who was on a two-day visit to the Andaman and Nicobar Islands, renamed three of the islands as a tribute to Subhas Chandra Bose. Ross Island was renamed as Netaji Subhash Chandra Bose Island; Neil Island as Shaheed Dweep Island; and Havelock Island as Swaraj Island. The PM made this announcement during a speech at the Netaji Stadium, marking the 75th anniversary of the hoisting of the Indian flag by Bose there.

Flora
The Andaman and Nicobar Islands have a tropical rainforest canopy, made of a mixed flora with elements from Indian, Myanmar, Malaysian and endemic floral strains. So far, about 2,200 varieties of plants have been recorded, out of which 200 are endemic and 1,300 do not occur in mainland India.

The South Andaman forests have a profuse growth of epiphytic vegetation, mostly ferns, and orchids. The Middle Andamans harbours mostly moist deciduous forests. North Andamans is characterised by the wet evergreen type, with plenty of woody climbers. The North Nicobar Islands (including Car Nicobar and Battimalv) are marked by the complete absence of evergreen forests, while such forests form the dominant vegetation in the central and southern islands of the Nicobar group. Grasslands occur only in the Nicobars, and while deciduous forests are common in the Andamans, they are almost absent in the Nicobar. The present forest coverage is claimed to be 86.2% of the total land area.

This typical forest coverage is made up of twelve types, namely:
 Giant evergreen forest
 Andamans tropical evergreen forest
 Southern hilltop tropical evergreen forest
 Canebrakes
 Wet bamboo brakes
 Andamans semi-evergreen forest
 Andamans moist deciduous forest
 Andamans secondary moist deciduous forest
 Littoral forest
 Mangrove forest
 Brackish water mixed forest
 Submontane forest

Fauna

This tropical rain forest, despite its isolation from adjacent landmasses, is surprisingly rich with a diversity of animal life.

About 50 varieties of forest mammals are found to occur in the Andaman and Nicobar Islands. Some are endemic, including the Andaman wild boar. Rodents are the largest group with 26 species, followed by 14 species of bat. Among the larger mammals there are two endemic varieties of wild boar, Sus scrofa andamanensis from Andaman and Sus scrofa nicobaricus from Nicobar, which are protected by the Wildlife Protection Act 1972 (Sch I). The Saltwater crocodile is also found in abundance. The State Animal of Andaman is the dugong, also known as the sea cow, which can be found in Little Andaman. Around 1962 there was an attempt to introduce the leopard, which was unsuccessful because of unsuitable habitat. These were ill-considered moves as exotic introductions can cause havoc to island flora and fauna. Elephants also can be found in forested or mountainous areas of the islands; they were brought over from the mainland to help with timber extraction in 1883.

About 270 species of birds are found in the Andaman and Nicobar Islands, 14 species of which are endemic. The islands' many caves are nesting grounds for the edible-nest swiftlet, whose nests are prized in China for bird's nest soup. The islands also serve as a stopover site for several migratory birds such as Horsfield's bronze cuckoo, Zappey's flycatcher and Javan pond heron.

The territory is home for about 225 species of butterflies and moths. Ten species are endemic to these Islands. Mount Harriet National Park is one of the richest areas of butterfly and moth diversity on Andaman and Nicobar Islands.

The islands are well known for prized shellfish, especially from the genera Turbo, Trochus, Murex and Nautilus. Earliest recorded commercial exploitation began during 1929. Many cottage industries produce a range of decorative shell items. Giant clams, green mussels and oysters support edible shellfishery. The shells of scallops, clams, and cockle are burnt in kilns to produce edible lime.

There are 96 wildlife sanctuaries, nine national parks and one biosphere reserve in the Andaman and Nicobar Islands.

Demographics

 Census of India, the population of the Union Territory of Andaman and Nicobar Islands was 379,944, of which 202,330 (53.25%) were male and 177,614 (46.75%) were female. The sex ratio was 878 females per 1,000 males. Only 10% of the population lived in Nicobar islands.

150 years ago, the original population of the islands – the Great Andamanese, the Onge, the Jarawa and the Sentinelese, were estimated to be around 5,000. The population of islands increased massively due to the policies of Govt of India into islands under Jawaharlal Nehru in the late 1960s, that brought settlers from other parts of the country.

The areas and populations (at the 2001 and 2011 Censuses) of the three districts are:

There remain approximately 400–450 indigenous Andamanese in the Andaman islands, the Jarawa and Sentinelese in particular maintaining steadfast independence and refusing most attempts at contact. In the Nicobar Islands, the indigenous people are the Nicobarese, or Nicobari, living throughout many of the islands, and the Shompen, restricted to the hinterland of Great Nicobar. More than 2,000 people belonging to the Karen tribe live in the Mayabunder tehsil of North Andaman district, almost all of whom are Christians. Despite their tribal origins, the Karen of Andamans have Other Backward Class (OBC) status in the Andamans.

Languages

Indigenous to the Nicobar Islands are the five Nicobarese languages, which form part of the Austroasiatic language family and are spoken by about  people, or 7.6% of the population of the union territory. The Andaman Islands are home to about a dozen endangered or extinct Andamanese languages, which constitute at least two families that are unrelated to each other or to any other language group.

The majority of the population, however, are speakers of immigrant languages. These include Bengali (the first language of 28.5% of the inhabitants of the union territory), Tamil (15.2%), Telugu (13.2%), Hindi (12.9%), Malayalam (7.2%). Sadri (5.5%), and Kurukh (4%).

Hindi is the official language of the Andaman and Nicobar Islands, while English is declared an additional official language for communication purposes.

Religion

The majority of people of the Andaman and Nicobar Islands are Hindus (69.45%), with Christians forming a large minority of 21.7% of the population, according to the 2011 census of India. There is a significant Muslim (8.51%) minority.

Administration
In 1874, the British had placed the Andaman and Nicobar Islands in one administrative territory headed by a Chief Commissioner as its judicial administrator. On 1 August 1974, the Nicobar islands were hived off into another revenue district with district headquarters at Car Nicobar under a Deputy Commissioner. In 1982, the post of Lieutenant Governor was created who replaced the Chief Commissioner as the head of administration. Subsequently, a "Pradesh council" with Councillors as representatives of the people was constituted to advise the Lieutenant Governor. The Islands sends one representative to Lok Sabha from its Andaman and Nicobar Islands (Lok Sabha constituency).

Administrative divisions
The Andaman and Nicobar Islands is divided into three districts:
 North and Middle Andaman (Capital: Mayabunder)
 South Andaman (Capital: Port Blair)
 Nicobar (Capital: Car Nicobar)

Each district is further divided into sub-divisions and taluks:

Sub-divisions and taluks of North and Middle Andaman district
 Diglipur Sub-Division
 Diglipur taluk
 Mayabunder Sub-Division
 Mayabunder taluk
 Rangat taluk

Sub-divisions and taluks of South Andaman district
 Port Blair Sub-Division
 Port Blair taluk
 Ferrargunj taluk
 Jirkatang taluk (native Jarawa reservation)
 Ritchie's Archipelago Sub-Division
 Ritchie's Archipelago taluk (Havelock Island)
 Little Andaman Sub-Division
 Little Andaman taluk (Hut Bay)

Sub-divisions and taluks of Nicobar district
 Car Nicobar Sub-Division
 Car Nicobar taluk
 Nancowrie Sub-Division
 Nancowrie taluk
 Kamorta taluk
 Teressa taluk
 Katchal taluk
 Great Nicobar Sub-Division
 Little Nicobar taluk
 Great Nicobar taluk (Campbell Bay)

Economy

Agriculture
Paddy, the main food crop, is mostly cultivated in Andaman group of islands, whereas coconut and arecanut are the cash crops of Nicobar group of islands. Field crops, namely, pulses, oilseeds and vegetables are grown, followed by paddy during Rabi season. Different kinds of fruits such as mango, sapota, orange, banana, papaya, pineapple and root crops are grown on hilly land owned by farmers. Spices such as pepper, clove, nutmeg, and cinnamon are grown under a multi-tier cropping system. Rubber, red oil, palm, noni and cashew are grown on a limited scale in these islands.

Industry
There are 1,374 registered small-scale, village and handicraft units. Two units are export-oriented in the line of fish processing activity. Apart from this, there are shells and wood-based handicraft units. There are also four medium-sized industrial units. SSI units are engaged in the production of polythene bags, PVC conduit pipes and fittings, paints and varnishes, fiberglass and mini flour mills, soft drinks, and beverages, etc. Small scale and handicraft units are also engaged in shell crafts, bakery products, rice milling, furniture making, etc.

The Andaman and Nicobar Islands Integrated Development Corporation has spread its wings in the field of tourism, fisheries, industries, and industrial financing and functions as authorised agents for Alliance Air. The Islands have become a tourist destination, largely due to its beaches and waters.

Tourism

Tourism to the Andaman and Nicobar Islands is increasing due to the popularity of beaches and adventure sports like snorkelling and sea-walking. Plans to develop various islands under NITI (National Institute of Transforming India) Aayog is also in progress. Luxury resorts with participation from the Government are set up to plan in Avis Island, Smith Island and Long Island.

In Port Blair, the main places to visit are the Cellular Jail, Mahatma Gandhi Marine National Park, Andaman Water sports complex, Chatham Saw Mill, Mini Zoo, Corbyn's cove, Chidiya Tapu, Wandoor Beach, Forest Museum, Anthropological Museum, Fisheries Museum, Naval Museum (Samudrika), Ross Island and North Bay Island. Viper Island which was earlier visited is now kept closed by the administration. Other places include Havelock island famous for Radhanagar Beach, Neil Island for Scuba diving/snorkeling/sea walking, Cinque Island, Saddle peak, Mt Harriet, and Mud Volcano. Diglipur, located at North Andaman is also getting popular in 2018 and many tourists have started visiting North Andaman as well. The southern group (Nicobar islands) is mostly inaccessible to tourists.

Indian tourists do not require a permit to visit the Andaman Islands, but if they wish to visit any tribal areas they need a special permit from the Deputy Commissioner in Port Blair. Permits are required for foreign nationals. For foreign nationals arriving by air, these are granted upon arrival at Port Blair.

According to official estimates, the flow of tourists tripled to nearly 430,000 in 2016-17 from 130,000 in 2008–09. The Radha Nagar beach was chosen as Asia's best beach in 2004.

Macro-economic trend 
This is a chart of trend of gross state domestic product (GSDP) of Andaman and Nicobar Islands at market prices, estimated by the Ministry of Statistics and Programme Implementation, with figures in millions of Indian rupees.

Andaman and Nicobar Islands' gross state domestic product for 2004 was estimated at $354 million in current prices.

Power generation 
With Japanese assistance, Southern Andaman Island will now have a 15-megawatt diesel power plant. This would be the first foreign investment of any kind allowed at this strategically significant island chain. This is believed to be an Indo-Japanese strategic initiative to strengthen civilian infrastructure in the vicinity of the Strait of Malacca – a strategically important choke-point for the Chinese oil supply.

Education

B.ed
Tagore Government College of Education

Degree
Andaman and Nicobar college
Jawaharlal Nehru Government College
Mahatma Gandhi Government College

Engineering
Dr. B. R. Ambedkar Institute of Technology
Pondicherry University (Port Blair-campus)

Law
Andaman Law College

Medicine
Andaman and Nicobar Islands Institute of Medical Sciences

Infrastructure

Mega projects 
Government of India has proposed the development of Great Nicobar. A terminal, two townships, Solar Power and an strips will be created for logistics and tourism purposes. This will give boost to Nicobar Islands and expected to provide employment. However project is considered as threat to indigenous communities on Nicobar Islands.

Internet 
Internet access on the islands used to be limited and unreliable, since all connectivity to the outside world had to go through satellite links. Bharat Broadband Network started work on laying a fibre optic submarine cable running from the five islands to Chennai on 30 December 2018, with completion expected in December 2019. On 10 August 2020, PM Narendra Modi formally inaugurated the Chennai–Andaman undersea Optical fibre cable which enables high-speed broadband connections in the Union Territory. The submarine cable also connects Port Blair to Swaraj Dweep, Little Andaman, Car Nicobar, Kamorta, Great Nicobar, Long Island and Rangat. The initial bandwidth of the cable is 400 Gbit/s, roughly 400 times more than what the islands possessed before the fibre link.

Ports 
On 10 August 2020, PM Narendra Modi announced plans for the construction of a transshipment port in the Great Nicobar Island at a cost of ₹10,000 crore to provide shippers an alternative to similar ports in the region. The move is aimed at improving the ease of doing business of the country and enhancing maritime logistics.

Transportation 

The only civil airport of the Andaman and Nicobar Islands is Veer Savarkar International Airport near Port Blair. It has regular flights to Chennai, Kolkata, New Delhi, Bangalore, and Visakhapatnam. From 2016 onwards, night flights were also operated along with the day flights.

Another mode of transport is ship which has routes from Chennai, Kolkata and Visakhapatnam. The journey takes approximately three days and two nights.

Popular culture
Sir Arthur Conan Doyle refers to the Andaman Islands in his Sherlock Holmes novel The Sign of the Four.

The National Award winning Malayalam film Kaalapani was set against backdrop of the Port Blair's Cellular Jail. It is one of the films that was extensively shot in the islands.

Most parts of the song Life Of Ram got shot in this island which is featured in the 2018 Tamil language film '96.

Gallery

See also

 2004 Indian Ocean earthquake and tsunami
 2014 Andaman boat disaster
 Andamanese peoples
 Coral reefs in India
 Effect of the 2004 Indian Ocean earthquake on India
 List of endemic birds of the Andaman and Nicobar Islands
 List of islands of India

References

External links

 Census of India, Provisional Population Totals
 Andaman and Nicobar Administration Website
 
 

 
Union territories of India
Andaman Sea
Dependent territories in Asia
Islands of the Bay of Bengal
Islands of the Andaman Sea
01
Volcanic arc islands
Maritime Southeast Asia
Southeast Asian countries
States and territories established in 1956
1956 establishments in India
Bengali-speaking countries and territories
States and union territories of India